Nikola Karaklajić  (Serbian Cyrillic: Никола Караклајић; born 5 February 1995) is a Serbian professional footballer who plays as an attacking midfielder for Greek Super League 2 club Panachaiki.

Career

Red Star Belgrade
He made his professional debut for Red Star Belgrade on 26 May 2013, in Serbian SuperLiga match versus Vojvodina.

Career statistics

References

Living people
1995 births
Footballers from Belgrade
Association football midfielders
Serbian footballers
Serbia youth international footballers
Red Star Belgrade footballers
FK Voždovac players
FK Sinđelić Beograd players
FK Čukarički players
FK Javor Ivanjica players
Serbian First League players
Serbian SuperLiga players